Der shtral was a weekly Yiddish-language newspaper published in Cape Town, South Africa in 1904. Lazarus Manfried was the editor and publisher of the newspaper.

References

Ashkenazi Jewish culture in South Africa
Jews and Judaism in Cape Town
Mass media in Cape Town
Publications established in 1904
Weekly newspapers published in South Africa
Yiddish newspapers